Whitman-Place House is a historic home located at West Hills in Suffolk County, New York. It was built about 1810 and is a -story, three-bay shingled residence which was greatly enlarged with a -story, three-bay south wing built in the 20th century.  Also on the property is an early-19th-century barn and springhouse.

It was added to the National Register of Historic Places in 1985.

References

Houses on the National Register of Historic Places in New York (state)
Houses completed in 1810
Houses in Suffolk County, New York
National Register of Historic Places in Suffolk County, New York